Cover Plus is the third album by English singer Hazel O'Connor, released in August 1981 by Albion Records. The album charted at number 32 on the UK Albums Chart. It was reissued on CD with bonus tracks on 17 November 2017 by Cherry Red Records.

Background 
On the back of the success of the Breaking Glass film and album, O'Connor released her first 'proper' album Sons and Lovers, produced by Nigel Gray. Despite including the Top-Ten hit "D-Days", the album failed to chart. This came as somewhat as a surprise, with O'Connor wanting to move on from the acting success of Kate in the film. Yet the album followed the same format of Breaking Glass album and in some parts it seemed as though she was trying too hard and coming over "a bit melodramatic and actor-ish vocally". Therefore, it was with some caution that O'Connor approached Cover Plus.

Content 
The album was produced by Tony Visconti, who had produced Breaking Glass, and combines several cover songs with original compositions, many of which were autobiographical. The cover artwork, by Edward Bell suggests O'Connor was moving away from the "peroxide punk look in favour of a more Bowie-esque style".

Four singles were released from the album. The title track "(Cover Plus) We're All Grown Up" is about being discovered playing doctors and nurses and is also about a loss of innocence. It peaked at number 41 on the UK Singles Chart. The only other single to chart was a cover of The Stranglers' "Hanging Around", which peaked at number 45 in the UK. "Men of Good Fortune" is a cover of a song by Lou Reed and was also given away with the ninth issue of Flexipop! magazine in August 1981. The last single released was "That's Life", which was written in the style of Édith Piaf and is a song about having no regrets over a broken romance. At the time of the release of the singles and the album, A&M Records were still promoting Breaking Glass, with "Will You?" released in May 1981 and "Calls the Tune" released in January 1982, which may have affected the commercial performance of Cover Plus.

"Ee-I-Addio" is a reworking of O'Connor's 1979 debut single "Ee-I-Adio" about childhood domestic abuse. The title comes from the nursery rhyme "The Farmer in the Dell". The original version is also included on the extended edition of the album. "Not for You" is about refusal to make promises in a personal relationship that could affect her own ideals of freedom. "Animal Farm (We Will Be Happy?)" is a take on the book by George Orwell. "Runaway" is about O'Connor's experience of running away to Amsterdam when she was 16. Another cover on the album is "Do What You Gotta Do", written by Jimmy Webb. O'Connor switches the genders around so that it is sung from her perspective.

The reissue's bonus tracks include "Time is Free", which was the B-side to the single release of "D-Days" from Sons and Lovers. Recorded a year before Cover Plus, it is more punky than the rest of the album. The next track, "White Room" was the B-side to "Cover Plus (We're All Grown Up)" and is softer and more folky, a style O'Connor would move into in later years. The final three bonus tracks are foreign language versions of album tracks: a rather fitting version of "That's Life" in French, as well as "Dawn Chorus" also in French, and "Not for You" in German.

Reception 

Reviewing the album for NME, Lynn Hanna wrote "Everything she's done so far has had that sense of something slight, sensationalised. On 'Cover Plus' this problem is compounded by her habit of picking on the most serious subjects and turning them into trite, often plain silly, observations with an added gloss of unconvincing melodrama. To take a thing like wife-beating and the whole horrible subject of family discord, called it 'Ee-I-Addio' and add a real kiddie chorus smacks of offensive emotional trickery rather than real hard heartbreak. By the same token 'Animal Farm (We Will Be Happy)' is a pointless treatment of George Orwell's celebrated political fable delivered in portentous tones that are insultingly empty."

Red Starr, reviewing for Smash Hits, wrote "No place for the sensitive this, as the utterly artless Hazel O'Nonotagain over-acts her way through another batch of spectacularly awful self-penned songs... plus a couple of equally hamfisted cover versions." The reviewer did however say that "her band are pretty good and she can knock out a reasonable tune."

However, reviewing the album for Record Mirror, Simon Tebbutt was much more positive, writing that the songs are "about her own life and experiences but don't somehow smack of the self indulgence and introspection I've come to associate with some many "me" writers. The lyrics might look flat on paper but take on an added dimension when coupled with the music. Even the covers of other people's work come over as felt rather than merely recited." Tebbutt concluded that the album "is certainly more sophisticated than what's gone before. There is a kind of muted feel about it but, like everything, if you like Hazel O'Connor you'll like it. I was never sure before if it was the music or the personality, but this album gives you a clearer idea of both."

Track listing 

2017 bonus tracks:

Personnel 
Musicians

 Hazel O'Connor – vocals
 Wesley Magoogan – saxophone, lyricon, backing vocals
 Eddie Case – drums, electronic drums, backing vocals
 Neil O'Connor – guitar, backing vocals
 Andy "Roots" Qunta – keyboards, backing vocals
 Steve Kinch – bass guitar, backing vocals
 Delaney Visconti, Jessica Visconti, Nicholas Donovan (as the Kids); Mary Hopkin, Lizzie Donovan (as the Mums) – additional backing vocals

Technical

 Gordon Fordyce, Chris Porter – engineers
 Edward Bell – sleeve artwork
 Arranged by Hazel O'Connor, Tony Visconti and Megahype (the backing band)
 Recorded and mixed at Good Earth Studios, London, May–June 1981

Charts

References 

1981 albums
Albums arranged by Tony Visconti
Albums produced by Tony Visconti
New wave albums by English artists